1,4-Bis(trichloromethyl)benzene is an organic compound with the formula C6H4(CCl3)2.  A white solid, it is prepared industrially by chlorination of para-xylene.  It reacts with terephthalic acid to give terephthaloyl chloride, a precursor to Kevlar. It also reacts with sulfur dioxide to give the same acid chloride and thionyl chloride. It reacts with hydrogen fluoride in 1,2-dichloroethane to form 1,4-bis(chlorodifluoromethyl)benzene in a yield of 79%.

See also
Benzotrichloride

References

Trichloromethyl compounds
Benzene derivatives